Uday Sotang Rai, credited as Uday Sotang is a Nepali musician and singer. He has written and composed numerous songs, and sung many of them himself. Most of his songs have been rendered by his wife Manila Sotang.

Personal life
Uday Sotang is originally from Tukvar, near Darjeeling, India. He moved to Kathmandu to pursue his musical career in 1988. Uday Sotang is married to Manila Sotang who is a Nepali singer. Their daughter Shreya Sotang is an upcoming singer who has already released an album.

Music
With more than 200 songs to his credit, Uday Sotang is considered to be one of the popular and successful Nepali musicians. He is based in Kathmandu, Nepal. The husband-wife duo of Uday and Manila have produced more than 10 music albums. They have produced many albums under the name "U ani Ma" (U standing for Uday, meaning "the other person" in Nepali; and Ma standing for Manila, meaning "me" in Nepali).

Albums
 Jhajhalko
 Darpan
 Muskan
 Katha
 Aatma Katha
 Bhid Dekhi Bahira
 Sandesh
 Marma
 Upama
 Sambaad
 Together (Hindi ghazal album)

References

External links
 Music of Uday Sotang

21st-century Nepalese male singers
People from Darjeeling district
20th-century Nepalese male singers

Year of birth missing (living people)
Nepali-language singers from India